Salah Ashour (born 8 September 1987) is an Egyptian footballer who plays for Misr Lel Makkasa, as a striker.

References

External links
 
 
 

1987 births
Living people
Footballers from Cairo
Egyptian footballers
Association football forwards
Egyptian Premier League players
ENPPI SC players
Asyut Petroleum SC players
Ittihad El Shorta SC players
Kazma SC players
Zamalek SC players
Misr Lel Makkasa SC players
Egypt international footballers
Egyptian expatriate footballers
Egyptian expatriate sportspeople in Kuwait
Expatriate footballers in Kuwait
Kuwait Premier League players